Sam Sheldon (born 8 March 1989) is a former Australian rules footballer who played for the Brisbane Lions in the Australian Football League.

Early life
Sheldon is of Indigenous Australian heritage and his tribal ancestry can be traced to the Wemba-Wemba. He also grew up in Echuca, where he attended St Joseph's College from year 7 and 8.

Draft
Sheldon was drafted to the Brisbane Lions in 2006. He could have opted to be drafted to the Carlton Football Club under the Father-Son Rule.

Personal life
His father is Ken Sheldon who played for Carlton and then for St Kilda in a career which included three premierships with Carlton in 1979, 1981 and 1982.

References

1989 births
Living people
Brisbane Lions players
Australian rules footballers from Victoria (Australia)
Indigenous Australian players of Australian rules football
People educated at Haileybury (Melbourne)
Oakleigh Chargers players